Christo Christov (11 April 1926 – 16 April 2007) was a Bulgarian film director and screenwriter. He directed 19 films between 1969 and 1997.

In 1973 he was a member of the jury at the 8th Moscow International Film Festival. His 1976 film Cyclops was entered into the 27th Berlin International Film Festival. His 1979 film The Barrier won the Silver Prize at the 11th Moscow International Film Festival. In 1981 his film The Truck was entered into the 31st Berlin International Film Festival. His 1985 film Reference was entered into the 14th Moscow International Film Festival.

Selected filmography
 The Last Summer (1974)
 Cyclops (1976)
 The Barrier (1979)
 The Truck (1981)
 Reference (1985)

References

External links

1926 births
2007 deaths
People from Plovdiv
Bulgarian filmmakers
Bulgarian film directors
Bulgarian screenwriters
Male screenwriters
20th-century screenwriters
National Academy for Theatre and Film Arts alumni